This is a list of football matches played by the South Korea national football team between 1948 and 1959.

Results by year

List of matches

1948

Source:

1949

Source:

1950

Source:

1953

Source:

1954

Source:

1956

Source:

1958

Source:

1959

Source:

See also
 South Korea national football team results
 South Korea national football team

References

External links

1940s in South Korean sport
1950s in South Korean sport
1940-1959